Steven 'Steve' Eliason is an American politician and a Republican member of the Utah House of Representatives representing District 45 since January 1, 2011.

Early life and career
Born May 26, Eliason earned his BS in accounting and his MBA from the University of Utah. He currently works as a Finance Director at the University of Utah Hospital and Clinics and lives in Sandy, Utah with his wife.

Political career

2020 
Eliason made the bill HB0322, which created two new state parks, including Utahraptor State Park.

2014 
Eliason was unopposed for the June 24, 2014 Republican Primary and won the November 4, 2014 General election with 4,908 votes (58.2%) against Democratic nominee Susan Marques Booth.

2012
Eliason was unopposed for the June 26, 2012 Republican Primary and won the November 6, 2012 General election with 8,048 votes (55.4%) against Democratic nominee Gary Forbush.

2010
To challenge incumbent Democratic Representative Laura Black, Eliason was unopposed for the June 22, 2010 Republican Primary and won the three-way November 2, 2010 General election with 4,198 votes (51.4%) against Representative Black and Constitution candidate David Perry, who had run for the seat in 2008.

During the 2016 General Session Eliason served on the Public Education Appropriations Subcommittee, the House Education Committee, the House Law Enforcement and Criminal Justice Committee and the House Retirement and Independent Entities Committee.

2016 sponsored legislation

Representative Eliason also floor sponsored SB002201 Foreclosure of Residential Rental Property, SB0038S04 School Funding Amendments, SB0091S02 Board of Education Amendments, SB0126 Committee Authority Amendments, SB0153 Self-reliance Training for Public Assistance Recipients, SB0239 School Governance Amendments, SB0248 Public Notice of Unclaimed Property, SB0252 Joint Tenancy Amendments, SB256 Judgment Interest Rate Amendments, and SCR012 Concurrent Resolution Recognizing the Importance of Utah Sport and Olympic Legacy Efforts.

References

External links
Official page at the Utah State Legislature
Steven Eliason at Ballotpedia
Steven Eliason at the National Institute on Money in State Politics

Place of birth missing (living people)
Year of birth missing (living people)
Living people
Republican Party members of the Utah House of Representatives
People from Sandy, Utah
University of Utah alumni
21st-century American politicians